Rishi Chanda is an Indian music director and singer.

Bengali discography

Composer

Singer

References

External links
 
 
 Rishi Chanda on Gomolo
 

Living people
Indian male musicians
Bengali musicians
Indian film score composers
Indian male film score composers
Year of birth missing (living people)
Musicians from Kolkata